This is a list of programs broadcast by Science Channel.

Science Channel broadcasts a number of science-related television series originally produced by or aired on Discovery Channel, such as Beyond Tomorrow, among others. Discovery Communications has also produced a few programs specifically for Science, such as MegaScience and What The Ancients Knew. Programs from other Discovery Networks channels, PBS and the BBC are either regularly or occasionally aired on the network. Television series produced in the 1990s, such as Discover Magazine and Understanding, are carried on the network's weekday schedule. Science also broadcasts programs such as Moments of Impact and An Idiot Abroad. The channel has experienced some drifting from its intended format throughout its existence, increasingly adding reruns on several science fiction series such as Firefly and Fringe to its schedule in recent years.

Series
Below is a selected list of Science series.

Against The Elements
Alien Encounters
All-American Makers
An Idiot Abroad
America’s Lost Vikings
Are We Alone?
Battlebots
Before We Ruled the Earth
Beyond Tomorrow
Black Files Declassified
Brainiac: Science Abuse
Brink
Build It Bigger
Building Giants
Building the Ultimate
Catch It Keep It
Chaos Caught on Camera
Close Encounters
Colossal Construction
Conspiracies Decoded
Cooper's Treasures: The Legend Continues
Cosmic Quantum Ray
Cosmos: A Personal Voyage
Curse of the Bermuda Triangle
Danger by Design
Dark Matters: Twisted But True
The Day The Universe Changed
Deconstructed
Destroyed in Seconds
Discover Magazine
Download The True Story of the Internet
Ecotech
Engineered
Engineering Catastrophes
Exodus Earth
The Explosion Show
Extreme Engineering
Extreme Ice Machines
Extreme Machines
Factory Made
Forbidden History
Firefly (re-runs)
Fringe (re-runs)
Futurescape with James Woods
The Gadget Show
Head Games
Head Rush
How Do They Do It?
How It's Made (see also List of How It's Made episodes)
How the Universe Works
Hurricane Man
If We Built It Today
Impossible Engineering
Impossible Fixes
Ingenious Minds
Invention Nation
It's All Geek to Me
Junkyard Wars
Killers of the Cosmos
Legends of the Deep
Lost Luggage
Living with Dinosaurs
Lost World Of Pompeii
Mammals Vs. Dinos
Mantracker
Mega Machines
Meteorite Men
Miracle Planet
The Moaning of Life
Monster Bug Wars
Monster Ships
Mummy Mysteries
Mutant Planet
Mysteries Of The Abandoned
Mysteries Of The Missing
MythBusters
MythBusters Jr.
MythBusters: The Search
NASA's Unexplained Files
Oddities
Outrageous Acts of Psych
Outrageous Acts of Science
Paleoworld
Patent Bending
Phantom Signals
Popular Science's Future of...
Prophets of Science Fiction
Race to Escape
Raging Planet
ReGenesis (re-runs)
Savage Builds
Sci Fi Science: Physics of the Impossible
Science of the Movies
Secret Nazi Ruins
Secrets Of The Underground
Shipwreck Secrets
Skyscrapers: Engineering the Future
Solar Empire
Space's Deepest Secrets
Species of Mass Destruction
Strange Evidence
Strip The City
Strip The Cosmos
Stuck with Hackett
Stuff You Should Know
Survivorman
Terra Nova (re-runs)
Through the Wormhole (with Morgan Freeman)
Tomorrow's World Today
T-Rex: New Science, New Beast
Tracking Africa's Dinosaurs
Triassic Giants
Truth Behind the Moon Landing
Underground Marvels
Understanding
Unearthed
Unearthing Ancient Secrets
Unearthing Ancient Secrets 2
Unearthing Ancient Secrets 3
Unexplained and Unexplored
The Unexplained Files
Utah's Dino Graveyard
What Could Possibly Go Wrong?
What on Earth%3F (American TV program)
Wonders of the Solar System
Wonders of the Universe
World's Strangest

Specials and miniseries
2057 – Predictions on the future technology of the body, city, and the world.
Uncovering Aliens - 2013 mini series of 4 episodes.
Base Camp Moon – Returning to the moon, harvesting moon dust for oxygen/water, robotics (Robonaut), etc.
The Challenger Disaster – A biography surrounding the mystery of the titular tragedy, starring William Hurt. Science's first foray into dramatic programming, its premiere on the channel will be simulcast on sister network Discovery Channel.
The Critical Eye – An eight-part series examining pseudoscientific and paranormal phenomena.
Dinosaur Revolution – A four-part miniseries on the natural history of dinosaurs. The last two episodes were planned to air on Discovery Channel, but a last-minute schedule change landed them on Science.
Exploring Time –  A two-hour TV documentary mini-series about natural time scale changes 
Extreme Smuggling
Futurecar – New technology may be used to create advanced cars and sometimes funny cars in the future.
Hawking – About the early work of British theoretical physicist Stephen Hawking.
Hubble Live – Launch of Space Shuttle Atlantis on NASA's Servicing Mission 4 (HST-SM4), the eleven-day fifth and final mission to repair the Hubble Space Telescope
A Life In Memory – An hour-long documentary about Memories, and PTSD and the ways they effect our lives. "Barney recalls the day he was hit by a car: his back was broken, and his wife was killed. Today, he will be given a pill to erase the memory of that tragic day for good. At a treatment center in Montreal, PTSD patients are given a second chance at life."
Lost Luggage – Rebroadcasts of An Idiot Abroad episodes from previous seasons, each including two new "Lost Luggage" segments filmed at Ricky Gervais' home in England in which Gervais and Karl Pilkington hold brief discussions.
Mars Rising – A six-part series on possible future missions to Mars.
NextWorld – Predicting the future of the world, humanity, and life.
Outlaw Tech
Perfect Disaster – Predicting violent natural disasters that could happen in the near future.
Prophets of Science Fiction – Biographies of some of the greatest sci-fi authors.
Punkin Chunkin – A one-hour condensed version of the World Championship pumpkin chunking contest in Sussex County, Delaware. Traditionally aired on Thanksgiving.
Science of Star Wars – Explains how the cutting edge technology of Star Wars might be useful and possible to implement in everyday life.
Tank on the Moon – Concentrates on Russian attempts to launch an unmanned rover to the Moon before the successful American Apollo program.
What the Ancients Knew – Rediscovered innovations of the ancient world.
The Planets (miniseries)
The Planets and Beyond

References

Lists of television series by network